The 1975 San Francisco 49ers season was the franchise's 26th season in the National Football League and their 30th overall. Head Coach Dick Nolan and his squad came into the 1975 Season to improve on a 6–8 season in 1974. However, for the second time in three seasons, the team finished with a 5–9 record, and missing the playoffs for the third consecutive season. Head Coach Dick Nolan was let go after the season. The highlight of the season was a 24–23 victory over the Rams in Los Angeles.

Offseason

NFL Draft

Roster

Regular season

Schedule

Standings

References 

 1975 49ers on Pro Football Reference
 49ers Schedule on jt-sw.com

San Francisco 49ers seasons
San Francisco 49ers
1975 in San Francisco
San